Karma - Koi Aa Raha Hai Waqt Badalney is an Indian superhero television series written by Subodh Chopra and directed by Pavan S Kaul. The show aired on Star Plus from 20 August 2004 to 11 February 2005. It was the first ever action-thriller show from the Balaji Telefilms.

Karma involves the battle between good and evil as the titular superhero faced off against demonic evil. The main cast of the show was Siddharth Choudhary in the titular role of Karma, Riva Bubber and Tinnu Anand.
The show is based in a fictitious city named panaki but it is actually has been shot in Mumbai and some other popular cities in India.
The series was re-aired on Star Utsav and Pogo.

Earlier titled as Kalki, it was later renamed before premiere to Karma - Koi Aa Raha Hai Waqt Badalney. When titled as Kalki, the pilot episode was rejected by Star Plus during early 2003 after which the series was reworked as Karma.

Plot
Karan Kapoor (Siddharth Choudhary) is born with supernatural powers, however he is oblivious to the fact until his twenty-first birthday when his powers increase at an alarming rate. He discovers that he was the "chosen one" who was born to defeat evil forces of Markesh (Mohan Kapoor). Teaming up with Gayatri Ji (Sudha Chandran / Sonia Kapoor), he decides to finish the evil.

Meanwhile, he is in senior college, he notices that his classmates were cheating in exams and he discloses the fact to the school head. After that, those students beat him till death, but he is revived by his maternal grandfather Devdutt (Tinnu Anand) with the power of his meditation. As Devdutt uses the seven stars to revive him, he gets filled with the power of seven stars. After that he gets superpowers. His friend Mrinal Deshmukh  (Riva Bubber), whom he loved, helps him out with his assignments as helping Karan while Karan saves her from all dangers by becoming Karma. Karma wears a black armor with seven stars in the center and a cape. Karma hides his identity from the people by wearing a mask on his eyes containing seven stars which shows that his power is the power of seven stars. He also throws a star sometimes with a 'K' written on it. He fights Markesh's assassins like Gunshot (Gaurav Chopra), Char Sau Chalis (Vindu Dara Singh), Tilisma (Vicky Ahuja), Gilgit and Sonika to protect the Panaki (The city where he resides). Karan had not got his love Mrinal and Mrinal had not loved her, so karan was searching for anyone else who will take care of his life. At last, in a face-to-face confrontation, he and Markesh find out that Markesh's mother and Karma stars were close and killing Karma will result in Markesh's mother's death too. Therefore, Karma smartly plots to separate Markesh and Markesh's mother, so as to weaken them. In fact, he makes Markesh think that his mother is dead. And with many problems in Karan's own personal life, the show abruptly ends, with Karan lastly saying that he is Karma, he should keep on doing his duty without expecting any fortune for himself.

Cast
 Siddharth Choudhary as Karan Kapoor / Karma
 Riva Bubber as Mrinal Deshmukh 
 Mohan Kapoor / Nawab Shah as Markesh 
 Tinnu Anand as Devdutt (Karan's maternal grandfather)
 Sudha Chandran as Gayatri (Guru Maa)
 Gaurav Chopra as Gunshot
 Melissa Pais as Kaira
 Aisha Shah as Maya
 Amita Chandekar as Mansi Mahesh Kapoor (Karan's mother and Devdutt's daughter)
 Nasser Abdullah as Professor Mahesh Kapoor (Karan's father)
 Sikandar Kharbanda as Rocky
 Anuj Gupta as Lalit
 Deepak Jethi as Challenger 
 Ketan Karande as Yaksh / Markesh's Henchman
 Vicky Ahuja as Tilisma
 Vindu Dara Singh as Culprit 440
 Rio Kapadia as Chief Executive Officer  of Right News Channel 
 Kali Prasad Mukherjee as Dr. Merchant 
 Puneet Vashisht as Jimmy Fernandes
 Sonia Kapoor as Gayatri (Guru Maa)
 Mithilesh Chaturvedi as Joe
 Ali Hassan

References

External links

Balaji Telefilms television series
2004 Indian television series debuts
2005 Indian television series endings
Indian drama television series
StarPlus original programming
Television superheroes
Indian children's television series
Indian superhero television shows
Indian fantasy television series
Indian action television series